HMS Barbados was a Colony-class frigate of the United Kingdom that served during World War II. She originally was ordered by the United States Navy as the Tacoma-class patrol frigate USS Halsted (PF-76) – sometimes spelled Halstead – and was transferred to the Royal Navy prior to completion.

Construction and acquisition
The ship, originally designated a "patrol gunboat," PG-184, was ordered by the United States Maritime Commission under a United States Navy contract as USS Halsted. She was reclassified as a "patrol frigate," PF-76, on 15 April 1943 and laid down by the Walsh-Kaiser Company at Providence, Rhode Island, on 11 May 1943.  Intended for transfer to the United Kingdom, the ship was renamed Barbados by the British prior to launching and was launched on 27 August 1943, sponsored by Miss Anna M. Pacheco.

Service history
Transferred to the United Kingdom under Lend-Lease on 18 December 1943, the ship served in the Royal Navy as HMS Barbados (K504) on patrol and escort duty.

Disposal
The United Kingdom returned Barbados to the U.S. Navy on 15 April 1946. She was sold to the Sun Shipbuilding and Drydock Company of Chester, Pennsylvania, on 30 October 1947 for scrapping.

References 
Notes

Bibliography
 
 Navsource Online: Frigate Photo Archive HMS Barbados (K 504) ex-Halstead ex-PF-76 ex-PG-184

1943 ships
Ships built in Providence, Rhode Island
Tacoma-class frigates
Colony-class frigates
World War II frigates and destroyer escorts of the United States
World War II frigates of the United Kingdom